PAN is a Berlin-based record label founded in 2008 by Bill Kouligas. The label is known for its interdisciplinary approach to the fields of contemporary art and music, and has collaborated with institutions such as London's ICA. PAN has signed and distributed records by a number of acts including Yves Tumor, Amnesia Scanner, Anne Imhof, Arca and Eartheater.

In 2017, PAN released its first compilation album, Mono No Aware, a collection of ambient songs by artists under the PAN label.

References

German record labels
2008 establishments in Germany
Experimental music record labels